Navah is a given name. Notable people with the name include:

Navah Perlman (born 1970s), American concert pianist and chamber musician
Navah Wolfe, American editor